This article is intended to give an overview of green building in New Zealand.

Green Building Council

The New Zealand Green Building Council formed in July 2005. An establishment board was formed later in 2005 and with formal organisational status granted on 1 February 2006. That month Jane Henley was appointed as the CEO and activity to gain membership of the World Green Building Council began. In July 2006 the first full board was appointed with 12 members reflecting wide industry involvement. The several major milestones were achieved in 2006/2007; becoming a member of the international green building council, the launch of the Green Star NZ — Office Design Tool, and welcoming of member companies.

Green Star
The Green Star rating system is a tool implemented by the NZGBC to measure the environmental attributes and performance of buildings. The system is voluntary and similar to that of other countries.

See also
 Sustainability in New Zealand
 Environment of New Zealand
 Energy Efficiency and Conservation Authority

References

External links
New Zealand Green Building Council
Ministry for the Environment - Building and housing
Ministry for the Environment - Green Building Assessment Tool Research Project
Sunday Star Times - "Green building as good as gold", Rod Oram